The Minister for Energy (Swedish: Energiministern) is a cabinet minister within the Swedish Government and appointed by the Prime Minister of Sweden.

The minister is responsible for issues regarding energy, the energy market and the development of renewable energy. The current Minister for Energy is Ebba Busch, appointed on 18 October 2022.


List of Ministers for Energy 

Status

Energy